The following radio stations broadcast on AM frequency 1300 kHz: The Federal Communications Commission classifies 1300 AM as a Regional broadcast frequency. See List of broadcast station classes.

Argentina
 LRA5 Nacional in Rosario
 Plus in Lanus, Buenos Aires
 La Salada in Lomas de Zamora, Buenos Aires

Mexico
 XEAWL-AM in Jacala, Hidalgo
 XECPAD-AM in Xalapa Veracruz
 XEP-AM in Cd. Juárez, Chihuahua
 XEXV-AM in Arroyo Seco, Guanajuato
 XEXW-AM in Nogales, Sonora

United States

References

Lists of radio stations by frequency